MediaWiki is an open-source wiki engine whose first version, 1.1, was released in 2003. The following table contains the MediaWiki version history, showing all of its release versions.

Table

Timeline

See also
 Special:Version, special MediaWiki page that shows the current installed software.  It is available on all MediaWiki sites.

External links
 MediaWiki release notes on mediawiki.org
 MediaWiki version lifecycle on mediawiki.org

MediaWiki
Software version histories